The Atucha Nuclear Complex, or Atucha Nuclear Power Plant, is the location for two adjacent nuclear power plants in Lima, Zárate, Buenos Aires Province, about  from Buenos Aires, on the right-hand shore of the Paraná de las Palmas River. Both are pressurized heavy-water reactors (PHWR) employing a mixture of natural uranium  and enriched uranium (0.85% of 235U), and use heavy water for cooling and neutron moderation.

The other currently operating nuclear power plant in the country Embalse Nuclear Power Plant is also a natural uranium fueled PHWR but of the Canadian CANDU 6 type rather than the Siemens provided type used at Atucha.

Atucha I

Atucha I was started in 1968 and began operation in 1974; it was the first nuclear power plant in Latin America. On 25 March 1973, before its completion, the plant was temporarily captured by the People's Revolutionary Army who stole a FMK-3 submachine gun and three .45 caliber handguns. When they retired they had a confrontation with the police, injuring two police officers.

It has a thermal power of 1,179 MWth, and generates 357 MWe of electricity, which is delivered at 220 kilovolts to the Argentine Interconnection System, supplying about 2.5% of the total electricity production (2005).

Atucha II
Atucha II is a natural uranium fueled reactor, which construction started in July 1981 under a contract with Siemens, but was halted in 1994. It was planned to have a much higher power (thermal power approx. 2,000 MW, electrical 750 MW) than Atucha I. At the time when it was started, it had the largest reactor pressure vessel of any nuclear power plant worldwide. The total cost as of 2006 was estimated at US$3.8 billion, or about $5500/kWe. Atucha II like Atucha I before it is one of only a handful of heavy water reactors of a type other than the CANDU-type or the related IPHWR-type ever built. Prior to the EPR it was the last nuclear power plant built by Siemens.

Partly as a response to the energy shortage caused by natural gas crisis of 2004, the issue of Atucha II was taken up by the Argentine government. In 2005 President Néstor Kirchner signed a decree to reactivate the construction and pledged to finish it by 2009. New technicians were hired and a budget of about $120 million was requested for 2006. Eduardo Messi, president of Nucleoeléctrica Argentina S.A. (the firm in charge of the plant), told reporters that 93% of the components were either in storage or already installed.

On 23 August 2006 the government announced the re-activation of the national nuclear programme, and updated its promise to finish Atucha II by 2010, devoting a total of 1,850 million pesos ($596/€466 million). The plant was slated to come online with an installed capacity of about 750 MW (3% of Argentina's total electric installed capacity).

Atucha II was "pre-started" on 28 September 2011 by President Cristina Fernández de Kirchner and it was scheduled to start commercial service by mid-2013.

On 3 June 2014 reached its first criticality, and on 27 June 2014 began to produce energy.

On 19 February 2015, the plant reached 100% power production for the first time, increasing the percentage of nuclear power in Argentina's energy mix from 7% to 10%.

Atucha III
In February 2022, Argentina and the China National Nuclear Corporation agreed on an engineering, procurement, and construction contract for a Hualong One nuclear power plant with a gross generation capacity of 1200 MWe, at a cost of about US$8 billion. Unlike the other two blocks the Hualong One is a light water reactor - which would make it the first such reactor in the country - and thus needs a higher enriched fuel, requiring Argentina either to build up uranium enrichment facilities or to import fuel for this reactor. The Hualong One is also not capable of online refueling but it is a much more powerful design than the other two blocks at Atucha and will have a higher nameplate capacity than the other two reactors combined.

See also

 Nuclear energy in Argentina
 National Atomic Energy Commission
 Embalse nuclear power plant
 List of nuclear reactors

References

External links
  Monografias.com
  RinconDelVago.com

Nuclear power stations in Argentina
Science and technology in Argentina
Heavy water reactors